Gallen-Kallela may refer to:

 Akseli Gallen-Kallela (1865–1931), Finnish painter
 Jorma Gallen-Kallela (1898–1939), Finnish artist
 Janne Sirén (also known as Janne Gallen-Kallela-Sirén, born 1970), Finnish historian and museum director

Finnish-language surnames
Compound surnames